Wentworthville railway station is located on the Main Western line, serving the Sydney suburb of Wentworthville. It is served by Sydney Trains T1 Western and T5 Cumberland line services.

History
Wentworthville station opened in 1883 as TR Smiths Platform, being renamed Wentworthville on 1 August 1885. The station was rebuilt in the 1940s when the Main Western line was quadrupled.

In 2015, work commenced on an upgrade to the station. Like the neighbouring stations at Pendle Hill and Toongabbie. The upgrade included a new footbridge, concourse and lifts as part of the Station Accessibility Upgrade Program and was completed in 2018.

Platforms & services

Transport links
Hillsbus operate four routes via Wentworthville station:
705: Parramatta station to Blacktown station via Pendle Hill, Seven Hills & Lalor Park
708: Parramatta station to Constitution Hill via Pendle Hill
709: to Constitution Hill
711: Parramatta station to Blacktown station via Westmead Hospital, Seven Hills & Lalor Park

Transit Systems operates one route via Wentworthville station:
818: Merrylands station to Westmead Hospital

Wentworthville station is served by two NightRide routes:
N70: Penrith station to Town Hall station
N71: Richmond station to Town Hall station

References

External links

Wentworthville station details Transport for New South Wales

Easy Access railway stations in Sydney
Main Western railway line, New South Wales
Railway stations in Sydney
Railway stations in Australia opened in 1883
Cumberland Council, New South Wales
City of Parramatta